Seguenzia keikoae is a species of sea snail, a marine gastropod mollusk in the family Seguenziidae.

Description
The size of the shell varies between 2 mm and 2.5 mm.

Distribution
This marine species occurs off the Philippines.

References

External links
 

keikoae
Gastropods described in 2006